The Luton Buzzard was a 1930s British single-seat, open cockpit ultralight aircraft built by Luton Aircraft Limited.

History
The Buzzard was a single-seat ultralight of wooden construction, fitted with split flaps and an all-flying tailplane, and powered by a 35 hp Anzani inverted Vee air-cooled engine. The Buzzard was designed by C.H. Latimer-Needham, and built by Luton Aircraft at Barton-in-the-Clay, Bedfordshire in 1936. The only Buzzard, registered G-ADYX and designated the Buzzard I first flew in 1936. On 16 November 1936, it was damaged during landing at Christchurch, Hampshire.

In 1937, it was rebuilt as the Buzzard II with short-span wings, enclosed cockpit and an orthodox tailplane. On 8 May 1938, it was damaged beyond repair while being demonstrated at a Royal Aeronautical Society 'garden party' at Great West Aerodrome. In 1943, the aircraft remains were destroyed when the company's Phoenix Works at Gerrards Cross burnt down.

Variants
Buzzard I
Prototype open cockpit ultralight, one built.
Buzzard II
Buzzard I rebuilt with enclosed cockpit and other modifications.

Specifications (Buzzard II)

References

1930s British civil utility aircraft
Low-wing aircraft
Aircraft first flown in 1936